Suspense is a 1946 film noir directed by Frank Tuttle.  The ice-skating-themed film stars Barry Sullivan and former Olympic skater Belita. It was also the last film appearance of actor Eugene Pallette. At a cost of 1.1 million dollars, it was considered the most expensive film put out by Monogram Pictures.

Plot
Joe Morgan (Barry Sullivan), an unkempt newcomer to Los Angeles arriving from New York, is looking for work and is directed to a nearby theater featuring an ice show starring Roberta Elva (Belita).  Harry Wheeler (Eugene Pallette), the main assistant at the theater, hires Morgan to sell peanuts and do other odd jobs.  Watching Roberta's performance, Morgan is immediately taken with her.  After the show, he tries to strike up a conversation with her, but as she is driven away by the theater's producer, Frank Leonard (Albert Dekker).  Wheeler tells Morgan that the two are married.

Later, Roberta is still avoiding Morgan's advances, but when he suggests a new act for the show, involving Roberta skating and leaping through a circle of long sharp knives, Leonard promotes him to a managerial position.  Leonard leaves Morgan in charge of the theater while he goes off on a business trip, and Morgan continues to pursue Roberta as she seems to soften toward him.  Returning to his apartment one night, Morgan is surprised to discover Ronnie, a former girlfriend from New York, who is still fixated on him and now lives across the hall.  When Leonard returns from his trip, he begins to suspect Morgan's attention to Roberta and takes her away for a winter vacation at his mountain cabin.

Morgan unexpectedly arrives at the cabin one night with some papers for Leonard to sign, though he really wants to see Roberta.  Leonard still suspects Morgan's intentions but invites him to stay for a while and later sees him and Roberta embracing.  The next morning, Morgan goes with Roberta to a frozen lake to watch her practice, but Leonard follows soon after with a hunting rifle.  From his vantage point above the lake, Leonard shoots at Morgan but misses and triggers an avalanche that seems to bury him.

Returning to Los Angeles, Roberta resumes her show with Morgan's name now on the marquee, but each is haunted by the feeling that they are being watched.  Ronnie is becoming increasingly jealous as the couple's affair becomes more open and arranges to find out more about why Morgan left New York.  Morgan and Roberta become increasingly anxious about whether Leonard is really dead, and Morgan is especially upset at a party when he discovers Leonard's ring in his champagne glass.  Soon after, while working late hours in his office, Morgan is approached by a shadowy figure.  From outside, Roberta and Wheeler hear sounds of an apparent struggle, but when Roberta goes to investigate, she finds Morgan alone, locking a large roll-top desk that had previously been left unlocked.  Roberta also finds a pipe like the one owned by Leonard, but Morgan assures her that it's his own.

The next day, the roll-top desk has been replaced by a new one, and Morgan brusquely explains that he'd had the old one taken away and burned in the building's furnace because it was no longer functional.  Morgan becomes increasingly distant and hostile to Wheeler and even Roberta, whose suspicions are aroused.  Going to the furnace to investigate, she gets Morgan to confess that he had killed Leonard and put his body inside the now-burned desk.  She tells Morgan that she will not turn him in but that he must confess to the police himself.  That night, Ronnie also confronts Morgan with information (never fully explained) about why he left New York, but Morgan attacks her.

Worried that Roberta will go to the police, Morgan loosens one of the long knives used in Roberta's performance so that it will cut her when she jumps through the circle.  At the last moment in her act, though, he suddenly yanks the device away.  Retreating through the stage door, Morgan is apparently ready to flee, but he is confronted by Ronnie, who shoots and kills him.  As the camera moves away from the alley, we see the theater's marquee again, with the lights spelling out "Joe Morgan" being extinguished.

Cast
 Belita as Roberta Leonard, aka Roberta Elva
 Barry Sullivan as Joe Morgan
 Bonita Granville as Ronnie
 Albert Dekker as Frank Leonard
 Eugene Pallette as Harry Wheeler
 George E. Stone as Max
 Edit Angold as Nora
 Leon Belasco as Pierre Yasha
 Miguelito Valdés as himself, a Cuban singer
 Byron Foulger as Cab Driver (uncredited)
 Chris-Pin Martin as Waiter (uncredited)
 Sid Melton as Man at Bar (uncredited)

Production
Musical numbers include

 "Eas'-Side Boogie," by Tommy Reilly
 "With You in My Arms," by Dunham and Alexander, sung by Bobby Ramos
 "Ice Cuba," with Miguelito Valdes, singing "Cabildo"

Morris King described the film as "a psychological treatment of Crime and Punishment."

Reception
The film performed well at the box office.

Critical response
When the film was first released, critic Bosley Crowther reviewed the film caustically, writing, "The Monogram people are so puffed up by the fact that their new film, Suspense, which came yesterday to the Victoria, is their first 'million-dollar release' that we wonder why some boastful genius didn't give it the title 'Expense.' At least, such a tag would betoken the little there is in this film and it wouldn't provoke expectation of something that isn't there. For, apart from some ice-skating numbers (which presumably coat all that coin), it has nothing to recommend it—let alone the thing of which the title speaks ... Frank Tuttle was the director from a script by Philip Yordan. Neither of their contributions is in the million-dollar class."

More recently, film critic Dennis Schwartz, panned the film in his review, writing, "Monogram's most expensive film to date, produced by the King Brothers (Maurice and Frank) ... The heavy melodrama is suggestive of a nightmare. It is ruined by its leaden pace, lack of suspense, unpleasant characters, and unconvincing script. The film felt like a truck stuck on the ice, noisily moving back and forth to get some traction."

References

External links
 
 
 
 
 Suspense informational site and DVD review at DVD Beaver (includes images)
 
 Review of film at ''Variety'

1946 films
1946 drama films
American drama films
American black-and-white films
1940s English-language films
Film noir
Films directed by Frank Tuttle
Films scored by Daniele Amfitheatrof
Monogram Pictures films
Figure skating films
Avalanches in film
1940s American films